The String Quartet No. 6 in F minor, Op. 80 was composed by Felix Mendelssohn in 1847. It was the last major piece he completed before he died two months later, on 4 November 1847. It is believed he composed the piece as an homage to his sister  Fanny, who died on 14 May of that year.

The quartet was first heard in private on 5 October 1847 in the presence of Ignaz Moscheles. The first public performance was on 4 November 1848 at the Leipzig Konservatorium with  Joseph Joachim, Mendelssohn's young mentee, playing the violin. The other members of the quartet were Moritz Klengel, Freidrich Hermann, and Carl Wittman, all regular performers with Leipzig's Gewandhaus Orchestra. The score was published posthumously in 1850 by Breitkopf & Härtel, Mendelssohn's longtime publishing house. The original manuscript is stored in the Jagiellonian Library in Kraków, Poland.

Movements 

 Allegro vivace assai 
 Allegro assai
 Adagio
 Finale: Allegro molto

References

External links 

String quartets by Felix Mendelssohn
1847 compositions
Compositions in F minor
Compositions by Felix Mendelssohn published posthumously